"Why Not" is a song recorded by American actress and singer Hilary Duff. It was written by Charlie Midnight with Matthew Gerrard, who also produced the song. It was released on April 15, 2003, by Walt Disney Records as the first single from The Lizzie McGuire Movie soundtrack. The version of the song on Duff's 2003 album Metamorphosis features different lyrics in the first verse.

Release
Disney International released the single internationally on June 23, 2003. The CD single release included a remix of "Why Not," a remix of "I Can't Wait" and the music video. Later in 2003, a different version of "Why Not" was released on Duff's first album, Metamorphosis. According to Duff, the song is also included as a single for the album Metamorphosis.

Versions
"Why Not" has three versions. The main version is the one which Duff originally recorded for the soundtrack of The Lizzie McGuire Movie. The second version features different lyrics in the first verse and was included on Duff's 2003 album Metamorphosis. A third version was released on Duff's 2005 compilation album Most Wanted and is a slightly remixed version of the recording released on Metamorphosis. The Metamorphosis album version is included on Duff's 2008 compilation album Best of Hilary Duff.

Music video
The video (directed by Elliott Lester), which was shot in downtown Los Angeles, first premiered on the Disney Channel in April 2003. The video became the first of Duff's to air on MTV after a viewer requested it on the popular show Total Request Live. The video debuted on the show's countdown at number six a few days later. The video shows Duff singing from a rooftop; this is inter-cut with scenes of street scenes of skipping, break dancing and crowds running, as well as waist shots of extras mouthing the words. Two distinct versions of the video exist; the one includes scenes from The Lizzie McGuire Movie while the other does not.

Commercial performance
The single debuted on the Australian ARIA Singles Chart at number forty in week twenty-six of 2003, and it peaked at number fourteen in its twelfth week, remaining on the chart for sixteen weeks. The song also reached the top twenty in New Zealand and the Netherlands.  As of July 27, 2014, the song had sold 124,000 digital copies in the United States.

Track listing

Charts

Weekly charts

Year-end charts

Release history

References

2003 debut singles
Hilary Duff songs
Songs written by Charlie Midnight
Songs written by Matthew Gerrard
Lizzie McGuire
Walt Disney Records singles
2003 songs
Song recordings produced by Matthew Gerrard
Music videos directed by Elliott Lester